A primal cut or cut of meat is a piece of meat initially separated from the carcass of an animal during butchering. Examples of primals include the round, loin, rib, and chuck for beef or the ham, loin, Boston butt, and picnic for pork.

Different countries and cultures make these cuts in different ways, and primal cuts also differ between type of carcass. The British, American and French primal cuts all differ in some respects. For example, rump steak in British and Commonwealth English is commonly called sirloin in American English. British sirloin is called porterhouse by Americans. Another notable example is fatback, which in Europe is an important primal cut of pork, but in North America is regarded as trimmings to be used in sausage or rendered into lard. The primal cuts may be sold complete or cut further.

The distinct term prime cut is sometimes used to describe cuts considered to be of better quality; for example in the US Department of Agriculture meat grading systems, most use prime to indicate top quality.

US primal cuts

Beef 
Beef primal cuts:

Major 
 Round
 Loin
 Rib
 Chuck

Minor 
 Plate
 Brisket
 Foreshank

Veal 
Veal primal cuts:
 Legs
 Loin
 Hotel rack
 Square cut chuck/shoulder

Pork 
Pork primal cuts:

 Ham
 Loin
 Boston butt
 Picnic
 Belly with spare ribs

Lamb 
Lamb primal cuts:

 Leg
 Loin
 Rack
 Chuck

National variations

See also 

 Cuts of beef
 Cuts of lamb
 Cut of pork

References

External links